Chagai may refer to:

 Chagai District, a district in Balochistan, Pakistan
 Chagai, Pakistan, the capital city of Chagai District
 Chagai Hills, a mountainous region in the district
Chagai-I, the codename for Pakistan's first nuclear weapon tests
Chagai-II, the country's second nuclear weapon test

See also 
 Chagai Zamir, an Israeli paralympic champion
 Chaggai, a Hebrew prophet and one of the twelve minor prophets in the Hebrew Bible
 Chagay (disambiguation)